The Coolidge Woman's Club, at 240 W. Pinkley Ave. in Coolidge, Arizona, was built in 1928.  It was listed on the National Register of Historic Places in 1990.

It is a  adobe building, designed by Phoenix architect C. Lewis Kelley.

It was the first building in Coolidge built for "public activities", and it "housed many civic groups and soon became the social center of the community."

References

External links

Women's club buildings in Arizona
National Register of Historic Places in Pinal County, Arizona
Mission Revival architecture in Arizona
Buildings and structures completed in 1928
History of women in Arizona